The Äkim (әкім) of Astana is the chief authority in the city of Astana (formerly Nur-Sultan). The position was established in 1997 when the capital was moved to Astana from Almaty. Currently the position is being held by Zhenis Kassymbek.

List of äkims of Astana 
 Amanjol Bölekpaev (1992–1997) 
 Ädılbek Jaqsybekov (1997–2003)
 Temırhan Dosmūhambetov (2003–2004)
 Ömırzaq Şökeev (2004–2006)
 Asqar Mamin (2006–2008)
 İmanğali Tasmağambetov (2008–2014)
 Ädılbek Jaqsybekov (2014–2016)
 Äset İsekeşev (2016–2018)
 Baqyt Sūltanov (2018–2019)
 Altai Kölgınov (2019–2022)
 Zhenis Kassymbek (2022–present)

References 

 
1997 establishments in Kazakhstan